Banco Angolano de Investimentos (formerly Banco Africano de Investimentos), short BAI, was founded in 1996 as the first private bank in Angola. The BAI is a full-service bank operating in Angola with a nationwide network of (mid-2012) 89 branches in all 18 provinces, with 41 of those branches in Luanda Province. In 9 of the 18 provinces, BAI operates only one branch office.

The largest shareholder is Sonangol, with 8.5% of the bank's capital. Arcinella Assets and Sforza Properties hold 7% respective 6.5% of the shares, six others hold 5% each; the remaining 48% are spread in smaller allotments.

The BAI has one representation in Portugal, the Banco BAI Europa S.A. with two branches, Lisbon and Porto. In 2008 BAI opened the Banco BAI Cabo Verde in Cape Verde with several branches.
During the last year, BAI bought the Banco BAI Microfinanças (BMF), a small bank in Angola that offers several services including Western Union payment transfers.

BAI also is the shareholder in other companies, like the Banco Sul Atlantico (BSA), IFI in Cape Verde,  Brasil Banco Múltiplo in Brazil, Banco Internacional de S. Tomé e Príncipe (BISTP) in São Tomé and Principe and other companies.

References 

Banks of Angola
Banks established in 1996
1996 establishments in Angola
Companies based in Luanda